Henry Lewis Whitfield (June 20, 1868 – March 18, 1927) was an American politician who was Governor of Mississippi from 1924 until he died in 1927.

Biography
Whitfield was born in Rankin County, Mississippi. He began his teaching career at the age of sixteen. Whitfield obtained his teaching degree in 1895 from the Mississippi College. Governor Anselm J. McLaurin appointed Whitfield to state superintendent of education in 1898. He was re-elected to the post in 1899 and 1903. Whitfield was appointed president of Industrial Institute and College in 1907. The college experienced growth under his leadership.

Whitfield was elected governor in 1923, narrowly defeating Theodore G. Bilbo. This was also the first election in which women could vote for the governor.

As governor, Whitfield recommended various progressive programs such as improving the mental health care system and public schools.

In 1926, Whitfield fell ill. He went to Memphis, Tennessee for treatment and returned to Jackson, Mississippi. While he could conduct business, his condition worsened, and he died in the Governor's Mansion. He is buried at the Friendship Cemetery in Columbus, Mississippi.

External links 
 Profile at National Governors Association website

1868 births
1927 deaths
Democratic Party governors of Mississippi
Mississippi University for Women faculty
Mississippi State Superintendent of Education
Heads of universities and colleges in the United States
People from Rankin County, Mississippi
Mississippi College alumni
Whitfield family